Ibrahim Aqif Biçakçiu (also known as Ibrahim Biçaku) (10 September 1905 – 4 January 1977) was an Albanian landowner and Axis collaborator, Chairman of the Provisional Executive Committee from September 14 to October 24, 1943, and Prime Minister of Albania from September 6 to October 26, 1944 during the Nazi occupation.

Biography

Early life
Born in 1905, Ibrahim Biçakçiu was the son of Aqif Pasha Biçakçiu of Elbasan. His family helped in the Independence of Albania and it was through his family's influence that he grew up with the same ideology and beliefs.

World War II
In 1943, together with Bedri bey Pejani and Xhafer Deva, he helped found a national committee of twenty-two Albanian and Kosovo Albanian leaders, which declared Albania independent from fascist occupation and which elected an executive committee to form a provisional government.

Prime minister
Following a week of negotiations, Ibrahim Biçaku agreed to lead a new and small government after Fiqiri Dine. Although Biçaku was the perfect friend of Germany, his reign was nevertheless quite incompetent. This was mainly because Germany was on the brink of defeat and the Albanian partisans were moving out, ready to strike. Tirana paper noted that he had headed the provisional executive committee exactly one year earlier, prior to the construction of the Mitrovica government. Biçaku had become, once again, the front man for the Germans. It was noted that Biçaku would occasionally play Ping-Pong with Ambassador .

After the war
Despite many of the Ballists fleeing Albania after the Communists announced their victory, Biçakçiu, like Father Anton Harapi and Cafo Beg Ulqini, chose not to leave and decided that he would rather die in his country of birth than on foreign soil. He was arrested by communist forces in Shkodra on 6 December 1944 and was sentenced to life in prison at the Special Court in Tirana on 13 April 1945. He spent most of his years in prison in Burrel and was released on 5 May 1962 in Elbasan. In his last years he was given a job as a public restrooms cleaner in his city of Elbasan. Biçakçiu died on 4 January 1977.

References

1905 births
1977 deaths
People from Elbasan
People from Manastir vilayet
Government ministers of Albania
Prime Ministers of Albania
Balli Kombëtar
Albanian diplomats
Albanian anti-communists
Albanian people of World War II
Albanian collaborators with Nazi Germany
Ibrahim
Heads of government who were later imprisoned